NGC 6120 is a peculiar spiral galaxy located roughly 440 million light-years (130 Megaparsecs) away from the Sun. It is located in the northern constellation of Corona Borealis, and is a member of the Abell 2199 galaxy cluster.

References

Further reading

External links
 
 

Corona Borealis
Spiral galaxies
6120